Zaytsevka is a rural locality (a selo) and the administrative center of Zaytsevskoye Rural Settlement, Kantemirovsky  District, Voronezh Oblast, Russia. The population was 545 as of 2010. There are 2 streets.

Geography 
Zaytsevka is located 13 km east of Kantemirovka (the district's administrative centre) by road. Garmashevka is the nearest rural locality.

References 

Rural localities in Kantemirovsky District